Mario Tozzi (30 October 1895 – 8 September 1979) was an Italian painter. He was awarded the Legion of Honour by the French government.

Biography
Tozzi  studied at the Accademia di Belle Arti di Bologna in Italy where he met Giorgio Morandi and Osvaldo Licini. He graduated in 1916.

After the First World War, he moved to Paris, France and founded the Groupe des Sept (also known as Les Italiens de Paris) with Massimo Campigli, Giorgio de Chirico, Filippo de Pisis, Renato Paresce, Alberto Savinio and Gino Severini.

Tozzi returned to Rome in 1936. His work was exhibited at the Venice Biennale in 1938, 1942, 1948, 1952 and 1954.

He returned to France in 1971, dying there in 1979.

A catalogue raisonné of his paintings was published In 1988  by Giorgio Mondadori Editore  and edited by Marilena Pasquali.

Public collections
 Centre Georges Pompidou, Paris, France
 Museum of Fine Arts of Lyon, Lyon, France
 Museum of Fine Arts Bern, Bern, Switzerland
 Pushkin Museum, Moscow, Russia
 Museo del Novecento, Milan, Italy
 Bologna Museum of Modern Art, Bologna, Italy
 Galleria Nazionale d'Arte Moderna, Rome, Italy

References

Further reading

External links
 Archives of the Works of Mario Tozzi

1895 births
1979 deaths
20th-century Italian painters
Italian male painters
Recipients of the Legion of Honour
People from the Province of Pesaro and Urbino
Accademia di Belle Arti di Bologna alumni
20th-century Italian male artists